The 2020–21 Moldovan Under-19 Division was the Moldovan annual football tournament. The competition began on 26 September 2020 and ended on 23 May 2021.Season was suspended after matches played on 28 February 2021, as a result of COVID-19 pandemic in Moldova, and was resumed on 8 May 2021. As a consequence, the season was shortened to 14 matches per team.

Stadia and locations

Squads
Players must be born on or after 1 January 2003, with a maximum of five players per team born between 1 January 2002 and 31 December 2002 allowed.

League table
The eight clubs will play each other two times for a total of 14 matches per team.

Results 
Matches 1−14

Matches 15−28

References

2020–21 in Moldovan football